Choice of Arms (French: Le Choix des armes) is a 1981 French crime film directed by Alain Corneau. The main roles are played by Yves Montand, Catherine Deneuve and Gerard Depardieu. Although in structure a crime film, it is as much a character study of people under stress and an examination of aspects of French society.

Plot
Noël, a former gangster now breeding horses on his large estate outside Paris with his beautiful wife Nicole, has his quiet life turned upside down when two wanted crooks arrive in a stolen car. One is an old accomplice called Serge, fatally shot, while the other is a young psychotic called Mickey. When Serge dies, Noël buries him. Mickey goes into Paris and on his return finds two police detectives, Bonnardot and Sarlat, at Noël's house. After threatening them, he escapes and holes up with Dany, a friend in Paris.

Thinking that Noël had betrayed him to the police, he turns up one evening as a dinner party is in progress and terrorises everybody. Realising that Mickey must be stopped, Noël sends Nicole to a hotel for safety and calls on two old accomplices to help him find the madman. But, learning that a prize mare is sick, Nicole breaks cover and slips back home one night. Mickey is waiting there and takes her captive. However, the police have been trailing her and Sarlat challenges Mickey. In an exchange of fire, Sarlat kills Nicole while Mickey gets away.

Eventually, Noël and his friends locate Mickey's hideout and it is Noël on watch one morning when Mickey and Dany sortie out to rob the local bank. The bank guard shoots Mickey and, picking up the wounded man, Noël takes him to a safe house to die. However, the police have located the safe house and, in an exchange of fire, Sarlat kills Mickey. Then, considering Noël equally culpable, he empties the rest of his magazine without managing to hit him. After the last shot, Noël  takes him captive and drives away. On a lonely road, he empties the rest of his magazine at Sarlat, deliberately not hitting him, and leaves him there in shock. In a postscript, we see Noël adopt the little daughter of Mickey, whose mother had committed suicide.

Cast
 Yves Montand as Noel Durieux
 Gérard Depardieu as Mickey
 Catherine Deneuve as Nicole Durieux
 Michel Galabru as Bonnardot
 Jean-Claude Dauphin as Ricky
 Gérard Lanvin as Sarlat
 Christian Marquand as Jean
 Étienne Chicot as Roland Davout
 Richard Anconina as Dany

External links

1981 films
1981 crime films
French crime films
Films scored by Philippe Sarde
1980s French films